Ermischiella is a genus of beetles in the family Mordellidae, containing the following species:

 Ermischiella bejceki Horák, Farkac & Nakládal, 2012.
 Ermischiella castanea (Boheman, 1858)
 Ermischiella chichijimana Nomura, 1975
 Ermischiella fukiensis (Ermisch, 1952)
 Ermischiella hahajimana Nomura, 1975
 Ermischiella nigriceps Nomura, 1975
 Ermischiella papuana Franciscolo, 1950

References

Mordellidae